San Martino di Venezze is a comune (municipality) in the Province of Rovigo in the Italian region Veneto, located about  southwest of Venice and about  northeast of Rovigo.

San Martino di Venezze borders the following municipalities: Adria, Anguillara Veneta, Cavarzere, Pettorazza Grimani, Rovigo, Villadose.

References

External links 

Cities and towns in Veneto